Manthey, Mantey, or Mantei may refer to:

 Jerri Manthey (born 1970)
 August Christian Manthey (1811-1880), Norwegian politician
 Carl Viggo Manthey Lange  (1904–1999), Norwegian politician
 Halvard Manthey Lange (1902-1970), Norwegian diplomat, politician and statesman
 Ludvig Johan Carl Manthey (1809-1875), Norwegian civil servant
 Olaf Manthey (born 1955), German race driver and team owner
 Manthey Racing, German Porsche racing team

Mantei
 Matt Mantei (1973), American baseball player
 Mantei River, see Chilka Lake
 Manteis, Greek for "prophet"
 The Manteis (The Prophets), a fragmentary play by Sophocles

Mantey
 Mantey, Kansas, a community in the United States
 Edward Mantey (born 1946), senior commander in Ghana Air Force
 Nery Mantey Niangkouara, swim athlete in the 2004 Summer Olympics 
 Eberhard von Mantey (1869–1940), German Vice Admiral and Naval historian, see Operational Plan Three

See also
 
 
 
 
 
 
 Manta (disambiguation)
 Ciudad Mante, city in Tamaulipas, Mexico
 Manti (disambiguation)
 Mantis (disambiguation)